Smith River Falls – Fort Halkett Provincial Park is a provincial park in British Columbia, Canada, protecting Smith River Falls and the former Fort Halkett, a Hudson's Bay Company trading post.  The park is located at the confluence of the Smith and Liard Rivers.

References

External links
 

Liard Country
Provincial parks of British Columbia
Protected areas established in 2001
2001 establishments in British Columbia